The men's 60 kg boxing event at the 2015 European Games took place between 16 and 27 June at the Baku Crystal Hall.

Results

References

External links

Men 60